Christopher Andrew "Christy" Moore (born 7 May 1945) is an Irish folk singer, songwriter and guitarist. In addition to his significant success as an individual, he is one of the founding members of Planxty and Moving Hearts. His first album, Paddy on the Road was recorded with Dominic Behan in 1969. In 2007, he was named as Ireland's greatest living musician in RTÉ's People of the Year Awards.

Early life 
Moore was born in Newbridge, County Kildare, Ireland and attended Newbridge College. His mother Nancy Moore was a Fine Gael election candidate. He was originally a bank employee who wanted to express himself using traditional music. During a bank strike in 1966, which lasted twelve weeks, he went to England, as many striking officials did, but didn't return when the strike was settled. "I had a wild and wonderful time in England, with no bank manager looking over my shoulder," he said. Doing general labouring work, he frequented the folk clubs and the Irish music pubs where he met Seamus Ennis, Margaret Barry, Luke Kelly, Martin Byrnes and many other traditional musicians. When Irish singing trio The Grehan Sisters, with whom Moore was previously acquainted, moved to the north of England from Dublin in 1967, they assisted Moore to get a higher profile by giving him contacts and support slots on their concerts.

Musical career 
1973 brought his first major release, Prosperous, which brought together the four musicians who shortly thereafter formed Planxty: Liam O'Flynn, Andy Irvine and Dónal Lunny. For a time they called themselves "CLAD", an acronym of their names, but soon decided on Planxty.

After leaving Planxty in 1975, Moore continued on his solo career, reforming his old band on occasion (which he has been doing ever since). He also formed the band Moving Hearts with Lunny and five other musicians in 1980. In 1987 he appeared on Gay Byrne's The Late Late Show performing with The Dubliners for their 25th anniversary. In 2000, he published his autobiography, One Voice.

Moore's earlier lifestyle resulted in a decline in health and several operations. Moore's battle with alcohol, and subsequent heart operations, have taken their toll. At the end of the 1990s, Moore reduced his workload for medical reasons.

Some of Moore's songs are heavily influenced by drink and the effects of drink, his song "Delirium Tremens" being a good example. Listening to Johnny Mulhern's song "Hard Cases" caused Moore to recall the Galway drinking scene with local musicians Mickey Finn, Pete Galligan, Corky and Terry Smith.

On 17 April 2009, Moore released his first new studio album in four years, entitled Listen, and promoted it through a series of live gigs.

In December 2011, Moore released the album Folk Tale.  His next album Where I Come From was released in November 2013 and features a new protest song called "Arthur's Day".  The album peaked at number three in the Irish album charts. On the road was released in November 2017, while his most recent album Magic Nights was released in November 2019.

Political and social commentary 
Moore is best known for his political and social commentary which reflects a left-wing, Irish republican perspective, despite the fact that his mother was a Fine Gael county councillor and parliamentary candidate in Kildare. He supported the republican H-Block protestors with the albums H-Block in 1978, the launch of which was raided by the police, and The Spirit of Freedom. He has also recorded songs by the hunger striker Bobby Sands, including "Back Home in Derry" which is based on Gordon Lightfoot's song "The Wreck of the Edmund Fitzgerald". He ceased supporting the military activities of the IRA in 1987 as a result of the Enniskillen bombing.

Political songs he has performed throughout his career include Mick Hanly's "On the Blanket" about the protests of republican prisoners, "Viva la Quinta Brigada",  about the Irishmen who fought in the Spanish Civil War against Franco, and "Minds Locked Shut" about Bloody Sunday in Derry.

Moore has endorsed a long list of leftist support causes, ranging from El Salvador to Mary Robinson in the 1990 presidential election. He has incorporated songs about Salvador Allende ('Allende') and Ronald Reagan ('Ronnie Reagon') into his repertoire.

At the Glastonbury Festival in 2005, he sang about the Palestinian solidarity activist Rachel Corrie. He supported the anti-nuclear movement in Ireland playing in many concerts and at festivals in Carnsore Point for the cause.

Banned song 
"They Never Came Home" is a song about the Stardust fire of 1981 where 48 people died. The song was recorded on the Ordinary Man album and was released on the B-side of a single in 1985. The song achieved notoriety when Moore was taken to court over claims in the song prejudicial to an ongoing court case determining compensation. For instance, the song claimed, "hundreds of children are injured and maimed, and all just because the fire exits were chained". Mr Justice Murphy ordered the Ordinary Man album to be withdrawn from the shops, and costs were awarded against Moore. "Another Song is Born" was recorded for the album's re-release. "They Never Came Home" later appeared on his box set and on the album Where I come from.

Musical style 
His solo style includes driving rhythms on guitar and bodhrán as well as slower ballads.

Family 
Moore's brother Barry, whose stage name is Luka Bloom, is also a singer-songwriter. His nephew, Conor Byrne, is also a traditional flautist and tin whistle player, with Christy appearing on his Wind Dancer album.

Memorable events

Detention incident, 2004 
In October 2004, Moore was stopped and detained by Special Branch officers at the Welsh port of Holyhead, taken into an office and questioned about the lyrics of his songs. The following day, he released a statement saying: "My driver and I were stopped and held for two hours at Holyhead last Monday, under the Prevention of Terrorism Act 2002. My driver and I were held separately in two interrogation rooms. I found the whole experience threatening. I was questioned about the contents of my briefcase." Despite initial reports to the contrary, the singer's van, which was full of musical equipment, was not searched. "I was questioned about lyrics of songs and I was asked a lot of personal questions about members of my family and my children and about my home. At no time was I given any explanation as to why I was being held and interrogated in this manner", he added. He said the fact that Irish people are still being treated this way on their way to Britain is very "saddening". "I had hoped to deal with this matter out of the public domain. But seeing as it has become a news item, I feel the need to offer my side of the story. I found the whole affair quite frightening."

Desert Island Discs 
In June 2007, Moore was a guest on the BBC radio programme Desert Island Discs. He selected mainly Irish folk music that had inspired him and spoke of personal and political issues that had shaped his life, choosing a set of Uilleann pipes as his luxury item and The English and Scottish Popular Ballads as his choice book.

Penguin book of Irish poetry 
In 2010 Christy Moore's song "Lisdoonvarna" which he wrote gained entry in The Penguin Book of Irish Poetry.

Oxegen 
On Sunday 10 July 2011 Moore joined Coldplay on stage at the 2011 Oxegen Festival performing the song "Ride On".

Discography

Solo Albums 
 Paddy on the Road (1969)
 Prosperous (1972)
 Whatever Tickles Your Fancy (1975)
 Christy Moore (1976)
 The Iron Behind the Velvet (1978)
 Live in Dublin (1978)
 H Block (1980)
 Christy Moore and Friends (1981)
 The Time Has Come (1983)
 Ride On (1984)
 Ordinary Man (1985)
 The Spirit of Freedom (1986)
 Unfinished Revolution (1987)
 Voyage (1989)
 Smoke & Strong Whiskey (1991)
 King Puck (1993) No. 2
 Live at the Point (1994) No. 1
 Graffiti Tongue (1996) No. 2
 Traveller (1999) No. 1
 This is the Day (2001) No. 1
 Live at Vicar Street (2002) No. 1
 Burning Times (2005) No. 3
 Live at the Point 2006 (2006) No. 1
 Listen (2009) No. 1
 Folk Tale (2011)
 Where I Come From (2013)
 Lily (2016) No. 3
 On the Road (2017) No. 1
 Magic Nights (2019) No. 2
 Magic Nights on the Road (2019) No. 9
 Flying Into Mystery (2021)

With Planxty 
 Planxty (1972)
 The Well Below the Valley (1973)
 Cold Blow and the Rainy Night (1974)
 After The Break (1979)
 The Woman I Loved So Well (1980)
 Words and Music (1983)
 Live 2004 CD/DVD (2004)
 Between the Jigs and the Reels: A Retrospective CD/DVD (2016)

With Moving Hearts 
 Moving Hearts (1981)
 Dark End of the Street (1982)

Compilation albums 
 High Kings of Tara (1980) [Planxty & Various artists]
 Nice 'n Easy (1984)
 Aris (1984)
 Christy Moore (1988)
 The Christy Moore Collection 1981–1991 (1991)
 Christy Moore Collection Part 2 (1997) No. 4
 The Box Set 1964–2004 (2004) No. 2
  The Early Years 1969-81 (2020)

Filmography

Video 
 Christy (1995) 54 mins – Christy reflects on his life and career.

DVDs 
 Christy Moore Uncovered (2001) 104 mins – features collaborations with Jimmy MacCarthy, Wally Page, Shane MacGowan, Sinéad O'Connor and John Spillane.
 Live 2004 (Planxty DVD) The reunion of the hugely popular and influential group after a 20-year hiatus.
 Christy Moore Live in Dublin 2006 (2006) 143 mins – First time a live solo concert has been recorded and released outside CD format. Filmed over 4 nights in December 2005 and January 2006.
 Christy Moore's Come All You Dreamers – Live at Barrowland (2009) – Filmed in Barrowland in Glasgow featuring Declan Sinnott.

References

External links 
 Christy Moore's home page
 Review of a Christy Moore concert in Nottingham November 2007
 Review of a Christy Moore concert in Dublin in 2001
 Christy Moore The Early Years
 4711ers.org '4711' is a term Christy coined which refers to his online fanbase.

1945 births
Living people
20th-century Irish male singers
21st-century Irish male singers
Bodhrán players
Claddagh Records artists
Irish folk singers
Irish guitarists
Irish songwriters
Musicians from County Kildare
People educated at Newbridge College
People from County Kildare
People from Newbridge, County Kildare
Planxty members
Moving Hearts members